Justin Collins is a rugby league player.

Justin Collins may also refer to:

Justin Lee Collins, British TV personality and actor
Justin Collins (rugby union), New Zealand player
Justin Collins (Dark Shadows), fictional character